Wolfgang Schenck may refer to:

 Wolfgang Schenck (pilot) (1913–2010), German pilot
 Wolfgang Schenck (actor), German actor, starring in Effi Briest